State Road 406 (NM 406) is a  state highway in Union County, New Mexico, United States. NM 406's southern terminus is at U.S. Route 56/64/412 near Clayton, and the northern terminus is at NM 456 near the Oklahoma border. The route stays entirely within Union County.

Route description 
SR 406 begins at an intersection with US 56, US 64, and US 412 in a concurrency. The road then heads north, passing by a few farms. At an intersection with County Route A055, the route turns right toward the Oklahoma border. The road zigzags north and east again to an intersection with SR 410, which heads east toward Wheeless, Oklahoma. At SR 410, SR 406 again turns back north and hugs the Oklahoma border. The road then winds slightly passing through a mountainous terrain. It terminates at SR 456, which heads east as Oklahoma State Highway 325 toward Kenton.

Major intersections

See also

References

External links

406
Transportation in Union County, New Mexico